The Islamic State of Iraq (ISI), commonly referred to as al-Qaeda in Iraq, was a militant Salafist jihadist group that aimed to establish an Islamic state in Sunni, Arab-majority areas of Iraq during the Iraq War and later in Syria during the Syrian Civil War.

Islamic State of Iraq traces its origins to Jama'at al-Tawhid wal-Jihad, which was formed by the Jordanian national Abu Musab al-Zarqawi in Jordan in 1999. Al-Zarqawi led the group, under numerous name changes, until his death in June 2006. Jama'at participated in the Iraqi insurgency (2003–2011) following the 2003 invasion of Iraq by Western forces, and on 17 October 2004 al-Zarqawi had pledged allegiance to Osama bin Laden's al-Qaeda network; and the group became known as Tanzim Qaidat al-Jihad fi Bilad al-Rafidayn (commonly known as al-Qaeda in Iraq). In January 2006, Tanzim and five other Iraqi insurgent groups formed the Mujahideen Shura Council, which on 15 October 2006 merged to form Islamic State of Iraq. At their height in 2006–2008, ISI had military units or strongholds in Mosul and in the governorates of Baghdad, Al Anbar and Diyala, and they claimed Baqubah as their capital. The area under its control decreased dramatically following the 2007 troop surge, during which dozens of ISI leaders were killed by coalition forces.

The new group continued to be commonly referred to as al-Qaeda in Iraq. Shortly after al-Zarqawi's death, al-Qaeda in Iraq named a new leader, Abu-Hamzah al-Muhajir, thought to be a pseudonym, which the US military named as Abu Ayyub al-Masri, an Egyptian militant based in Baghdad. Al-Masri and ISI leader Abu Omar al-Baghdadi were killed during a military operation on a safehouse on 18 April 2010. Abu Omar al-Baghdadi was succeeded as leader of ISI by Abu Bakr al-Baghdadi. On 14 May 2010, al-Masri was succeeded by Abu Suleiman al-Naser (also known as al-Nasser Lideen Illah Abu Suleiman), who was in turn killed some time in 2011. Following Suleiman's death, the position of "War Minister" was replaced by a Military Council composed of former regime military officers under the leadership of Haji Bakr.

On 7 April 2013 Abu Bakr al-Baghdadi transformed ISI into the Islamic State of Iraq and the Levant (ISIL, ISIS, IS), which is still active today. Haji Bakr, whose name was Samir Abd Muhammad al-Khlifawi, was killed in January 2014, and was succeeded by Abu Abdulrahman al-Bilawi as head of the ISIL Military Council. Al-Bilawi was killed on 4 June 2014, and was reportedly succeeded by Abu Mohannad al-Sweidawi as leader of the ISIL Military Council. There were reports in November 2014 that al-Sweidawi had been killed in an Iraqi airstrike that reportedly also injured Abu Bakr al-Baghdadi. The Daily Beast reported that al-Sweidawi was succeeded by senior ISIL figure Abu Ali al-Anbari, who was in turn killed on 24 March 2016. Al-Anbari was considered the ISIL second-in-command in Syria and was viewed as a potential successor of ISIL's present leader Abu Bakr al-Baghdadi. The second-in-command in Iraq was Abu Muslim al-Turkmani, who was killed on 18 August 2015, and who was succeeded as the ISIL leader in Iraq by Abu Fatima al-Jaheishi.

Background 

Jordanian militant Abu Musab al-Zarqawi started a group called Jama'at al-Tawhid wal-Jihad (Organization of Monotheism and Jihad) in 1999, aiming to overthrow the 'apostate' Kingdom of Jordan. Although they are believed to have assassinated US diplomat Laurence Foley in 2002, they became notorious for their violent campaign in Iraq, which began in August 2003.

In October 2004, Zarqawi pledged alliance to Osama bin Laden and changed the name of his group to Tanzim Qaidat al-Jihad fi Bilad al-Rafidayn (Organization of Jihad's Base in Mesopotamia), often referred to as Al Qaeda in Iraq (AQI), which indulged in dozens of violent attacks per year in Iraq.

In January 2006, AQI merged with five smaller Sunni Islamist groups into the Mujahideen Shura Council (MSC) and continued its attacks in Iraq. In June 2006, al-Zarqawi was killed by a United States airstrike, and AQI's leadership passed to the Egyptian Abu Ayyub al-Masri.

General characteristics

Formation 
On 13 and 15 October 2006, messages on the Internet in the name of the Mujahideen Shura Council declared the establishment of the Islamic State of Iraq (ISI), which should encompass the governorates of Baghdad, Anbar, Diyala, Kirkuk, Saladin, Niniveh and parts of Babil and Wasit – a swathe of central and western Iraq where most Sunni Arabs live.

Goals 
In 2003–2004, under its earlier name Jama'at al-Tawhid wal-Jihad, the group's targets had included Shi'ite mosques and civilians, Iraqi government institutions, and the US-led Multi-National Force in Iraq. In 2005, under its name al-Qaeda in Iraq, its goals were: expelling the US from Iraq; turning Iraq into a (Sunni) Islamic state or caliphate and extending this program to neighboring countries. These continued to be its goals when it became the Islamic State of Iraq.

Leadership 
When ISI was formed in October 2006, Abu Omar al-Baghdadi was presented as its leader or emir. The US government initially believed Omar al-Baghdadi to be a fictitious persona, invented to put an Iraqi face on the leadership of ISI which the US saw as a front organization of the foreign-driven Al Qaeda in Iraq (AQI). However, US military officials later came to believe that the Baghdadi 'role' had been taken by an actual ISI leader.

Abu Ayyub al-Masri (an Egyptian also known as Abu Hamza al-Muhajir), was the leader of Al Qaeda in Iraq from June 2006;
officially, he was the Islamic State of Iraq's military commander, and from April 2007 its Minister of War.

Al-Masri and Omar al-Baghdadi were both reported killed on 18 April 2010 in a raid by Iraqi and US forces. On 16 May 2010, Abu Bakr al-Baghdadi was announced as the new leader of the Islamic State of Iraq; his deputy was Abu Abdallah al-Husseini al-Qurashi.

'Cabinet' 
In April 2007, the ISI declared a 'cabinet' of ten 'ministers', under its leader Abu Omar al-Baghdadi.
The 'ministers' included:
Abdullah al-Janabi, Minister of Security, was already wanted by the Iraqi Criminal Court since 2005. In 2014 he was still a prominent militant in Fallujah.
Abu Ayyub al-Masri, Minister of War, was already wanted by Iraqi and US-coalition authorities since 2005, and was killed by US/Iraqi forces in April 2010. He was succeeded by Abu Suleiman al-Naser.
Abu Bakr al-Baghdadi, who in May 2010 would become the new leader of ISI, was before April 2010 the general supervisor of ISI's provincial sharia committees and a member of its senior consultative council.

(For ISI management after April 2010, see also section 2010 revival ISI, new attacks.)

Funding and financing 
According to American authorities, the group lost considerable funding sources and popular support from 2007 onwards. A 2008 report on the group's funding reported that its most lucrative source of income was stolen oil in the region of Bayji (between Baghdad and Mosul), which yielded them $2 million a month. Other sources of income were kidnappings of wealthy Iraqi people for ransom, car theft, robbery, hijacking fuel trucks, counterfeiting, commandeering rations and shaking down Iraqi soldiers for ammunition, these activities brought in tens of millions of dollars. In addition, jihadists in Saudi Arabia and Syria and other elements outside Iraq provided funding.

Between 2005 and 2010, according to an analysis by RAND Corporation of 200 documents—personal letters, expense reports and membership rosters—captured by US Forces between 2005 and 2010, 95% of the group's budget was raised in Iraq, from the oil business, kidnappings, extortion, cash of members from Mosul, etc. Only 5% of the budget came from outside donations.

Structure 
In 2006, Iraqis effectively ran Al Qaeda in Iraq (AQI) in positions like internal security and battalion commanders, with foreign fighters' often relegated to suicide attackers, however the upper tiers of the organization were still dominated by non-Iraqis. AQI was a well-oiled and bureaucratic organisation with a high degree of documentation of its activities, from records of payments to its members, lists of opponents to be killed, and verdicts and sentences given to its prisoners.

In 2008, AQI appeared to have at least 80 execution videos, mostly beheadings, lying on the shelf that had never been distributed or released on the Internet: a former AQI commander told CNN that they were used to verify the deaths to their superiors and to justify continued funding and support. By the end of 2009, AQI was, according to US and Iraqi officials, a mostly Iraqi network of small, roving cells, still relying on fighters and weapons smuggled through the Syrian border.

For speculations about its later management structure, see section 2010, revival ISI.

Strength 
In August 2006, ISI's predecessor Al Qaeda in Iraq (AQI) had been considered by the United States as the dominant power in Iraq's Al Anbar Governorate, and al-Qaeda in Iraq's core membership was estimated that year as "more than 1,000". In 2007, estimates of the group's strength ranged from just 850 to several thousand full-time fighters. Between the withdrawal of U.S. troops from Iraq in late 2011, and late 2012, estimates of its strength more than doubled, from 1,000 to 2,500 fighters.

Topics 2006–2008

2006–2008 military presence or control 
The Washington Post reported that AQI came to control large parts of Iraq between 2005 and 2008. In Autumn 2006, AQI had taken over Baqubah, the capital of Diyala Governorate, and by March 2007 ISI had claimed Baqubah as its capital. In 2006, AQI/ISI had strongholds in Al Anbar Governorate, from Fallujah to Qaim, and were the dominant power there, according to the US. In 2007, ISI had military units in Baghdad Governorate, and in 2007–2008, ISI had strongholds in Mosul in Ninawa Governorate.

Between July and October 2007, AQI/ISI lost military bases in Anbar province and the Baghdad area and between April 2007 and April 2009, it lost considerable support, mobility and financial backing.

2006–2007 attacks claimed by or attributed to AQI/ISI 
The 23 November 2006 Sadr City bombings, killing 215 people, were blamed by the US on Al Qaeda in Iraq (AQI).

In February and on 16 and 27 March 2007, lethal attacks on Sunni Iraqi targets took place that were not claimed, but that either Western observers or Iraqi rivals blamed on AQI/ISI (see section 2007 conflicts with Sunni and nationalist Iraqi groups).

The 23 March 2007 assassination attempt on Sunni Deputy Prime Minister of Iraq Salam al-Zaubai was claimed by ISI: "We tell the traitors of al-Maliki's infidel government, wait for what will destroy you".

The 12 April 2007 Iraqi Parliament bombing was reportedly also claimed by ISI.

In May 2007, Islamic State of Iraq claimed responsibility for an attack on a US military post that cost the live of seven Americans.

The 25 June 2007 suicide bombing of a meeting of Al Anbar tribal leaders and officials at Mansour Hotel, Baghdad, killing 13 people, including six Sunni sheikhs and other prominent figures, was claimed by ISI who in a statement on the Internet said this attack was revenge for the rape of a girl by "members of the apostate police force at Anbar".

For the August 2007 Yazidi communities bombings, which killed some 800 people, US military and government sources named al-Qaeda as the "prime suspect", but there was no claim of responsibility for those attacks.

On 13 September 2007, ISI killed Sunni sheikh Abdul Sattar Abu Risha, and on 25 September, another lethal attack on Sunni as well as Shiite leaders was blamed on ISI (for both, see section 2007 conflicts with Sunni and nationalist Iraqi groups).

ISI expelling Christians 
In 2004, Sunni militants bombed churches and kidnapped Christians in the Baghdad district of Dora. The US military briefly 'cleared' Dora in autumn 2006, but militants tied to Al Qaeda in Iraq reestablished themselves in Dora in late 2006 and began harassing Christians. By January 2007, ISI proclamations appeared on walls in Dora and leaflets were circulated: women should wear veils; shorts and cellphones were prohibited. Christians were given the choice: either pay a tax, or become a Muslim, or leave the district. By May 2007, 500 Christian families had left Dora. ISI also targeted Christians in the 2010 Baghdad church massacre.For continued persecution of (Christian) Assyrians in 2014 by ISIL, see: Persecution of Assyrians by ISIL.

Threatening Iran 
In July 2007, ISI's leader Abu Omar al-Baghdadi threatened Iran with war: "We are giving the Persians, and especially the rulers of Iran, a two-month period to end all kinds of support for the Iraqi Shia government and to stop direct and indirect intervention ... otherwise a severe war is waiting for you." He also warned Arab states against doing business with Iran.

2007 conflicts with Sunni and nationalist Iraqi groups 

(See preceding events in: Conflicts between Al Qaeda in Iraq and other Sunni Iraqi groups, 2005–2006.)By the beginning of 2007, Sunni tribes and nationalist insurgents were battling with AQI over control of Sunni communities, and some Sunni groups agreed to fight the group in exchange for American arms, ammunition, cash, pick-up trucks, fuel and supplies (see also section 2007 US arming militias against AQI).

In February 2007, a truck bomb exploded near a mosque near Fallujah where the imam had criticised AQI, killing 35 people, the BBC suggested this attack may have been a retaliation from AQI.

On 16 March 2007, three attacks near Fallujah and Ramadi (50 km west of Fallujah) killed eight people: a BBC correspondent assumed two of those attacks to have been targeting tribal leaders who had spoken out against AQI.

On 27 March 2007, the leader of Sunni Arab insurgent group 1920 Revolution Brigades was killed. An official of the group blamed AQI for the attack. The 1920 Revolution Brigades had been rumored to have taken part in secret talks with American and Iraqi officials who tried to draw Sunni groups away from AQI.

Around 10 April 2007, a spokesman of Islamic Army in Iraq (IAI), a significant Sunni Arab insurgent group fighting Iraqi and US forces, accused AQI of killing 30 members of his group, and also members of the Army of the Mujahideen and the Ansar Al-Sunna resistance group, and called on AQI to review its behaviour: "Killing Sunnis has become a legitimate target for them, especially rich ones. Either they pay them what they want or they kill them", their statement said; "They would kill any critic or whoever tries to show them their mistakes. Assaulting people's homes became permitted and calling people infidels became popular". In a 42-minute audiotape released on 17 April, Abu Omar al-Baghdadi responded: "To my sons of the Islamic Army (…) We swear to you we don't shed the protected blood of Muslims intentionally", and, calling for unity: "One group is essential to accomplish victory".

The first week of June 2007, AQI fighters exchanged heavy fire with Sunni insurgents, including IAI members, in several Baghdad neighborhoods. On 6 June 2007, the Islamic Army in Iraq "reached an agreement with al-Qaeda in Iraq, leading to an immediate cessation of all military operations between the two sides", according to an IAI statement. An IAI commander explained to Time: IAI and ISI still disagree on some things, but "the most important thing is that it's our common duty to fight the Americans".

ISI on 14 September 2007 claimed responsibility for the killing of Sunni sheikh Abdul Sattar Abu Risha, leader of the Anbar Salvation Council, who had cooperated with the US to push the group out of Anbar Province, and vowed to assassinate other tribal leaders who cooperate with US and Iraqi government forces.

On 23 September 2007, ISI in a statement accused Hamas of Iraq and the 1920 Revolution Brigades of killing its fighters. On 25 September, a bomb in a Shiite mosque in the city of Baqubah, during a meeting between tribal, police and guerrilla leaders, killed leaders of Hamas of Iraq and the 1920 Revolution Brigades and others: local reports said the attack was the work of ISI.

US' rhetorical focusing on "al Qaeda (in Iraq)" 
During 2007, US authorities and President George W. Bush strongly emphasized the role of "Al Qaeda (in Iraq)" in violence, insurgency and attacks on US troops, and the threat of them acquiring 'real power' in Iraq. While some 30 groups claimed responsibility for attacks on US troops and Iraqi government targets in an examined period in May 2007, US military authorities mentioned the name 'al-Qaida (in Iraq)' 51 times against only five mentions of other groups.
Observers and scholars (like US Middle East specialist Steven Simon, US terrorism analyst Lydia Khalil, and Anthony H. Cordesman of the US Center for Strategic and International Studies) suggested that the role played by AQI was being unduly stressed.

In March 2007, the US-sponsored Radio Free Europe/Radio Liberty analyzed attacks in Iraq in that month and concluded that AQI had taken credit for 43 out of 439 attacks on Iraqi security forces and Shia militias, and 17 out of 357 attacks on US troops. According to National Intelligence Estimate and Defense Intelligence Agency reports in July 2007, AQI accounted for 15% of the attacks in Iraq. The Congressional Research Service noted in its September 2007 report that attacks from al-Qaeda were less than 2% of the violence in Iraq. It criticized the Bush administration's statistics, noting that its false reporting of insurgency attacks as AQI attacks had increased since the surge operations began in 2007. At a press conference on 29 December 2007, US General David Petraeus again said that "the vast majority" of attacks in Iraq are still carried out by AQI.

2007 US arming militias against AQI 

Starting early in 2007 in Anbar Province, according to American commanders and officials, Sunni groups in several Iraqi provinces that had grown disillusioned with AQI tactics like suicide bombings against Iraqi civilians, agreed to fight Al Qaeda in exchange for American arms, ammunition, cash, pick-up trucks, fuel and supplies, and in some cases had agreed to alert American troops on locations of roadside bombs and booby traps. This practice of negotiating arms deals with "Sunni insurgents" was approved of by the US high command in June 2007.

By December 2007, the so-called "Awakening movement", a Sunni Arab force paid by the American military to fight AQI, had grown to 65,000–80,000 fighters. The Iraqi government and some Shiites expressed their worry that this would lead to tens of thousands of armed Sunnis in autonomous tribal "Awakening groups", leading to Shiite militias growing in reaction, and potentially leading to civil war.

2007 US and others fighting AQI/ISI 

In January 2007, US President George W. Bush ordered an extra 20,000 soldiers into Iraq ('the surge'), mostly into Baghdad and Al Anbar Governorate, to help provide security and support reconciliation between communities, and explained the decision predominantly by pointing at the "outrageous acts of murder aimed at innocent Iraqis" by "Al Qaeda terrorists".

31 May 2007, in Baghdad's Amariyah district, gunmen shot randomly in the air, claiming through loudspeakers that Amariyah was under control of the Islamic State of Iraq. Armed residents are said to have resisted, set the men's cars on fire, and called the Americans for help; the Americans came in the afternoon, and "it got quiet for a while", according to one resident.

Between March and August 2007, US and Iraqi government forces fought the Battle of Baqubah in the Diyala Governorate against AQI, "to eliminate al-Qaeda in Iraq terrorists operating in Baqubah and its surrounding areas", resulting in 227 AQI fighters being killed and 100 arrested, and 31 US and 12 Iraqi soldiers being killed. By July 7,000 US troops and 2,500 Iraqi troops were fighting AQI/ISI in that battle, the US army claimed that 80 percent of AQI leaders had fled the area.

The US troop surge went into full effect in June 2007, and supplied the military with more manpower for operations targeting Islamic State of Iraq. According to US Colonel Donald Bacon, 19 senior al Qaeda in Iraq operatives were killed or captured by US and Iraqi Security Forces in July; 25 in August; 29 in September; and 45 in October.

By October 2007, US military were believed to have dealt devastating blows to AQI, but a senior intelligence official advised against a declaration of victory over the group, because AQI retained the ability for surprise and catastrophic attacks.

2008 US and others fighting AQI/ISI 
In Operation Phantom Phoenix, over January–July 2008, the multi-national force in Iraq attempted to hunt down the last 200 Al-Qaeda extremists in the eastern Diyala Governorate, which resulted in 900 'insurgents' being killed and 2,500 captured, and 59 US, 776 Iraqi, three Georgian and one UK soldiers killed. By May 2008, according to Newsweek, US and Iraqi military offensives had driven AQI from Al Anbar and Diyala Provinces, leaving AQI holed up in and around the northern city of Mosul.

The effect of the US troop surge between June 2007 and January 2009, together with American-funding of Sunni groups fighting AQI (see section 2007 US arming militias against AQI), was—according to The Washington Post—the killing or detention of 'scores of AQI leaders'.

Topics 2009–2010

2009 attacks (possibly) by ISI/AQI; revival 
3 January 2009, a suicide bomb attack in Yusufiyah, 25 miles from Baghdad, killed 23 people; The Christian Science Monitor speculated AQI was responsible. A local Sons of Iraq spokesman said: "There are still some tribes who are trying to hide AQI members".

After the Iraqi provincial elections in January 2009, AQI offered an olive branch to other Sunni extremist groups, and even extended "a hand of forgiveness" to those who had worked with the Americans. Some Sunni groups responded positively to this invitation.

Beginning of April 2009, 'Sunni insurgent groups' warned that they would step up attacks against US troops and Iraq's Shiite-led government. Between 7 and 22 April, 10 bomb attacks killed 74 people. Two more suicide attacks on 23 April 2009, causing 76 deaths, were without evidence attributed to 'AQI-affiliated' groups. Additional suicide bombings brought the number of Iraqis killed in bombings that month on 350.

In the 20 June 2009 Taza bombing near a mosque, 73 Shias were killed; Western media, like Reuters, hinted at "…Sunni Islamist insurgents, including al Qaeda…".

On 19 August 2009, three car bombs exploded in Baghdad, targeting the Iraqi Finance and Foreign Ministries, a hotel and a commercial district, killing 101 and injuring 563 people. The attacks were claimed, two months later, by Islamic State of Iraq, calling the targets "dens of infidelity".

On 25 October 2009 twin bombings targeted Iraqi government buildings in Baghdad killing 155 people and injuring 721, and were also claimed by Islamic State of Iraq.

In November 2009, Islamic State of Iraq issued another plea on the Internet, calling for Sunnis to rally around a common end goal. Iraqi (Shi'ite) Prime Minister Nouri al-Maliki—installed December 2006—claimed in November 2009 that Al Qaeda in Iraq and former Ba'athists were together trying to undermine security and the January 2010 elections.

8 December 2009, ISI committed five bomb attacks in Baghdad targeting government buildings and a police patrol, killing 127 people and injuring 448 more. ISI declared the targets "headquarters of evil, nests of unbelief".

2010 revival ISI, new attacks 
On 18 April 2010 Abu Ayyub al-Masri, leader of AQI, and Abu Omar al-Baghdadi, leader of Islamic State of Iraq, were killed in a joint US-Iraqi raid near Tikrit, On 16 May 2010 Abu Bakr al-Baghdadi was announced as the new leader of the Islamic State of Iraq; his deputy was Abu Abdallah al-Husseini al-Qurashi.

The New York Times reported that Abu Bakr al-Baghdadi had a preference for his deputies to be former Ba'athist military and intelligence officers who had served during the Saddam Hussein regime and who knew how to fight. He built a management structure of mostly middle-aged, Hussein-era Iraqi officers overseeing the group's departments of finance, arms, local governance, military operations and recruitment. These leaders added terrorist techniques, refined through years of fighting American troops, to their traditional military skill, and so made ISI a hybrid of terrorists and army. Analysts believe a Saddam-era officer, known as Haji Bakr, was appointed as military commander of ISI, heading a military council including three other former regime officers.

13 June 2010, suicide bombers disguised in military uniforms attacked the Central Bank of Iraq, killing 18 people and wounding 55. ISI claimed the attack in a 16 June message on the Hanein jihadist forum.

17 August 2010, ISI executed a suicide bomb attack on army recruits queuing outside a recruiting centre in Baghdad, killing 60 people. 19 or 20 August, ISI claimed the attack, saying it targeted "a group of Shias and apostates who sold their faith for money and to be a tool in the war on Iraqi Sunnis".

On 31 October 2010, members of ISI attacked Our Lady of Salvation Syrian Catholic church in Baghdad—purportedly in revenge for an American Christian burning of the Qur'an that had not actually happened yet. 58 worshippers, priests, policemen and bystanders were killed, and many were wounded.

2009–2010 US and others fighting ISI/AQI 
In May 2009, Iraqi officials said they again needed US troops in Diyala Governorate, because of suicide bomb attacks.

18 April 2010, Abu Ayyub al-Masri, leader of AQI, and Abu Omar al-Baghdadi, leader of Islamic State of Iraq, were killed in a joint US-Iraqi raid near Tikrit.

In June 2010, US General Ray Odierno said that 34 of 42 top leaders of AQI had been killed or captured, not specifying the period in which that had happened, and announced that AQI had "lost connection" with its leadership in Pakistan and would have difficulties in recruiting, finding new leaders, establishing havens, or challenging the Iraqi government.

In November 2010, 12 suspects, including Huthaifa al-Batawi, al-Qaeda in Iraq's "Emir of Baghdad", were arrested in connection with the October 2010 assault on Our Lady of Salvation church in Baghdad. Batawi was locked up in a counter-terrorism jail complex in Baghdad's Karrada district. During an attempt to escape in May 2011, Batawi and 10 other senior militants were killed by an Iraqi SWAT team.

Topics 2011–2013

Revival in Iraq 
According to the United States Department of State, AQI operated in 2011 predominantly in Iraq but it also had carried out an attack in Jordan, and maintained a logistical network throughout the Middle East, North Africa, South Asia and Europe.

In a speech on 22 July 2012, Al-Baghdadi announced a return of ISI to Iraqi strongholds they had been driven from by US forces and allied militias in 2007 and 2008 (see section 2007–2008, US and others fighting AQI/ISI), and a campaign to free imprisoned AQI members, and urged Iraqi tribal leaders to send their sons "to join the ranks of the mujahideen (fighters) in defense of your religion and honor … The majority of the Sunnis in Iraq support al-Qaida and are waiting for its return". In that speech, Baghdadi also predicted a wave of 40 attacks across Iraq the next day, in which more than 107 were killed and over 200 wounded.

Between July 2012 and July 2013, ISI carried out 24 waves of car bomb attacks and eight prison breaks in Iraq. By 2013, the Sunni minority increasingly resented Iraq's Shi'ite led-government, and Sunni insurgents regrouped, carrying out violent attacks and drawing new recruits.

Expansion into Syria 
In August 2011, Abu Bakr al-Baghdadi and al-Qaeda's central command authorized the Syrian ISI member Abu Mohammad al-Golani to set up a Syrian offshoot of al Qaeda, to bring down the Syrian Assad government and establish an Islamic state there. Golani was part of a small group of ISI operatives who crossed into Syria, and reached out to cells of militant Islamists who had been released from Syrian military prisons in May–June 2011 and were already fighting an insurgency against Assad's security forces. Golani's group formally announced itself under the name "Jabhat al-Nusra l'Ahl as-Sham" (Support Front for the People of the Sham) on 23 January 2012.

On 22 July 2012, Al-Baghdadi released a 33-minute speech, mostly devoted to the Syrian uprising or civil war: "Our people there have fired the coup de grace at the terror that grasped the nation [Syria] for decades … and taught the world lessons of courage and jihad and proved that injustice could only be removed by force", he said.

By the second half of 2012, Jabhat al-Nusra stood out among the array of armed groups emerging in Syria as a disciplined and effective fighting force. In December 2012, the US designated Nusra a terrorist organization and an alias of al Qaeda in Iraq. By January 2013, Nusra was a formidable force with strong popular support in Syria.

On 8 April 2013, ISI-leader Abu Bakr al-Baghdadi publicly announced that he had created Jabhat al-Nusra and was now merging them with ISI into one group under this command, the "Islamic State of Iraq and the Levant" (ISIL), also known as "Islamic State of Iraq and Syria" (ISIS). Golani rejected this merger attempt. Nusra split up, some members, particularly foreign fighters, followed Baghdadi's edict and joined ISIL, others stayed with Golani.

Comments on Egypt 
On 8 February 2011, when Egyptian mass protests ran in their 15th consecutive day, ISI called on Egyptian protesters to wage jihad and strive for an Islamic government: "The market of jihad (has opened) … the doors of martyrdom have opened … (Egyptians must ignore the) ignorant deceiving ways of rotten pagan nationalism … Your jihad is for every Muslim touched by oppression of the tyrant of Egypt and his masters in Washington and Tel Aviv".

2011 US designation 
On 4 October 2011, the United States Department of State listed ISI leader Abu Bakr al-Baghdadi as a Specially Designated Global Terrorist, and announced a reward of US$10 million for information leading to his capture or death.

See also 
List of bombings during the Iraq War

References 

2006 establishments in Iraq
2013 disestablishments in Iraq
Organizations established in 2006
Al-Qaeda activities in Iraq
Al-Qaeda in Iraq
Iraqi insurgency (2003–2011)
Jihadist groups in Iraq
Paramilitary organizations based in Iraq
History of the Islamic State of Iraq and the Levant
Organizations designated as terrorist by Iraq
Organizations designated as terrorist by Malaysia
Organizations designated as terrorist by the United States
Factions of the Islamic State of Iraq and the Levant